InTown Westchester is a regional lifestyle magazine that covers Westchester County, New York, and is published by Gannett and The Journal News. InTown was originally launched as a series of hyper-local editions targeting different regions of the county:

 White Plains
 Scarsdale
 Northern Westchester (Chappaqua, Mt. Kisco, Bedford, Kathonah)
 Larchmont/Mamaroneck
 Bronxville/Tuckahoe/Eastchester
 Rye/Harrison/Purchase
 River Towns (Hastings, Dobbs Ferry, Irvington, Tarrytown)
 Sound Shore (Pelham, New Rochelle, Larchmont, Mamaroneck, Rye, Port Chester)

In September 2006, these numerous editions were all consolidated into one county-wide publication, InTown Westchester, which publishes 12 times a year.

Past Issues 
 InTown White Plains - Spring 2005
 InTown Bronxville/Tuckahoe/Eastchester - Spring/Summer 2005
 InTown River Towns - Summer/Fall 2005
 InTown Larchmont/Mamaroneck - Fall/Winter 2005
 InTown White Plains - Fall/Winter 2005
 InTown Rye/Harrison/Purchase - Winter 2005
 InTown Holiday Issue - Winter 2005
 InTown Northern Westchester - 2006
 InTown River Towns - Spring 2006
 InTown Sound Shore - May 2006
 InTown Northern Westchester - June/July 2006
 InTown Sound Shore - June/July 2006
 InTown Northern Westchester - August 2006

External links 
 InTown Westchester website

2005 establishments in New York (state)
Lifestyle magazines published in the United States
Local interest magazines published in the United States
Monthly magazines published in the United States
Magazines established in 2005
Magazines published in New York (state)